During the Haitian Revolution (1791–1804), Haitian women of all social positions participated in the revolt that successfully ousted French colonial power from the island. In spite of their various important roles in the Haitian Revolution, women revolutionaries have rarely been included within historical and literary narratives of the slave revolts. However, in recent years extensive academic research has been dedicated to their part in the revolution.

Women in pre-revolutionary Saint-Domingue

In the French colony of Saint-Domingue, enslaved Black women suffered particular forms of gendered violence in addition to the standard abuse and mistreatment of slaves. Rape and sexual abuse of enslaved women commonly occurred in the colony; part of the logic of slavery was that since slaves were property, they could be used as sex objects by slave owners. Due to high infant mortality and a low fertility rate, slave women were kept from engaging in monogamous family relationships and instead treated as objects of reproduction.  Many of these women resorted to suicide.

Women's roles in the revolution

The Haitian Revolution was instigated by slaves in an attempt to not only liberate themselves but to remove the French from the island entirely. Rebels used a variety of tactics to meet this goal; women participated in all levels of the revolt.

Labor organising 
As laborers, enslaved women began to organize and refuse to perform life-threatening work. In one such case, women who worked the night shift in a sugarcane mill protested working with machinery in the dark that could seriously injure or kill them.

Vodou 
The practice of Vodou was a tool of the Haitian Revolution. Enslaved women who escaped their slave owners to live as maroons were able to return to their roles as practitioners of Vodou because they would not be punished for rejecting French Catholicism. Communities of escaped slaves turned to Vodou mambos, or priestesses, which radicalized them and facilitated the organization of a liberation movement.  Vodou mambos were also typically knowledgeable of herbal remedies as well as poisons, which were weaponized and used against French slave owners and their families during the revolution.  Ideologically, the image of a Haitian Vodou priestess inspired insurgents to fight the colonial government in order to not only liberate themselves but to serve a higher, spiritual purpose.

The most famous mambo in Haitian revolutionary history is Cécile Fatiman. Born of an enslaved woman and a slave owner, she is remembered for having performed a Vodou ceremony for hundreds of rebel slaves the night before the revolution began, inspiring them through ritual song and dance to take up the fight for freedom.  She reportedly lived to be 112 years old, never ceasing to practice Vodou. Another woman, Dédée Bazile, has a similar legacy as a mystic of the revolution. Although Dédée was not known as a mambo, she became known as Défilée-la-folle, or Défilée the Madwoman. Born to slaves, Dédée had several children conceived by rape committed by her master. Her “madness” was allegedly caused by the murder of her parents by French soldiers as well as the many instances of sexual violence she endured. After the murder of revolutionary leader Jean-Jacques Dessalines, she is said to have been responsible for gathering his decomposing remains, reassembling the pieces of his mutilated body, and ensuring that he be buried with dignity. Today, Dédée is hailed as an icon of the Haitian Revolution, a symbol of the “madness” of the Haitian people's commitment to their land.

Combat 

Women also took up arms and served in the anti-colonial Haitian military, participating at all levels of military involvement. Some scholars attribute the widespread participation of women in combat to West African traditions of allowing women to actively serve in battle. Some progressed as high up the ranks of the military as possible; Marie-Jeanne Lamartiniére, for example, served in Toussaint L'Ouverture's army. She led the insurgent forces in the famous Battle of Crête-à-Pierrot. From 1791-2, Romaine-la-Prophétesse and wife Marie Roze Adam led an uprising of thousands of slaves and came to govern two main cities in southern Haiti, Léogâne and Jacmel. Romaine was assigned and often regarded as male, but dressed and behaved like a woman, prominently identified as a prophetess and spoke of being possessed of a female spirit and may have been transgender, and is counted by Mary Grace Albanese and  among the women who led the Haitian Revolution. 

Women also assisted in carrying arms, cannons, and ammunition. They served as military nurses, relying on herbal and folk medicines to treat rebels in remote areas with little to no resources. In addition, women worked as spies, posing as sex workers and merchants in order to deliver messages and gain information about the French. Some women are reported to have used sex to obtain money, weapons, resources, military intelligence, manumission, or mercy for themselves or loved ones. These incidents were rarely the choices of the women involved; rather, women's bodies were used by Haitian military forces to further the revolution, which reinforced the pre-revolutionary patriarchal exploitation of women.

White women

In 1804 the revolutionary leader Jean-Jacques Dessalines led a campaign of massacres against white people.
In parallel to the killings, plundering and rape also occurred. Women and children were generally killed last. White women were "often raped or pushed into forced marriages under threat of death."
Dessalines did not specifically mention that the white women should be killed, and the soldiers were reportedly somewhat hesitant to do so. In the end, however, the women were also put to death, though normally at a later stage of the massacre than the adult males. The argument for killing the women was that whites would not truly be eradicated if the white women were spared to give birth to new Frenchmen.

Punishments 
Because of the high involvement of women in the Haitian Revolution, colonial French military forces let go of their plans to institute gender-specific punishments. When captured, women revolutionaries were executed alongside men, only occasionally receiving special treatment on the basis of their gender. Sanité Bélair, a Black freedwoman who served as a lieutenant in the army of Toussaint L'Ouverture, was sentenced to death following her capture. At the moment of her execution, she refused to be blindfolded by her executioners and is documented to have stared them in the eyes as she died.

References 
 

Haitian revolutionaries
Haitian women
Women in 18th-century warfare
Women in 19th-century warfare